Dietlikon is a municipality in the district of Bülach in the canton of Zürich in Switzerland, and belongs to the Glatt Valley (German: Glattal).

History

Dietlikon is first mentioned in 1124 as Dietlinchoven.

Geography
Of this area, 23.6% is used for agricultural purposes, while 31.1% is forested. Of the rest of the land, 44.1% is settled (buildings or roads) and the remainder (1.2%) is non-productive (rivers, glaciers or mountains).

The municipality is located on the edge of the middle Glatt Valley.

Demographics
, 21.8% of the population was made up of foreign nationals. Over the last 10 years the population has grown at a rate of 18%. Most of the population speaks German  (83.7%), with Italian being second most common ( 5.2%) and Serbo-Croatian being third ( 2.0%).

In the 2007 election the most popular party was the SVP which received 36.4% of the vote.  The next three most popular parties were the SPS (20.8%), the FDP (13.8%) and the CSP (9.7%).

The age distribution of the population is children and teenagers (0–19 years old) make up 20.5% of the population, while adults (20–64 years old) make up 65.3% and seniors (over 64 years old) make up 14.2%. In Dietlikon about 75.9% of the population (between age 25-64) have completed either non-mandatory upper secondary education or additional higher education (either university or a Fachhochschule).

Dietlikon has an unemployment rate of 3.09%.  , there were 27 people employed in the primary economic sector and about 8 businesses involved in this sector.  1379 people are employed in the secondary sector and there are 73 businesses in this sector.  4278 people are employed in the tertiary sector, with 303 businesses in this sector.
The historical population is given in the following table:

References

Transportation 
Dietlikon railway station is a stop of the Zürich S-Bahn on the lines S3, S8 and S19.

External links

 Official website 
 

Municipalities of the canton of Zürich